Joe Duffey (born 22 June 1982) is a retired rugby union player who played hooker for Nottingham RFC in the RFU Championship between 2003 and 2009, then again between 2011 and 2013, he played for Leicester Tigers in Premiership Rugby between 2009 and 2011. He is Maori descent from his mother's side and belongs to Te aitanga Hauiti and Ngati Porou Iwi and also Irish/English descent from his father's side.

Career 

Duffey spent five seasons at Nottingham RFC before joining Leicester Tigers in the summer of 2009. Duffey was a replacement as Leicester won the 2010 Premiership final. Having spent two seasons with Leicester Tigers, Duffey rejoined Nottingham RFC for the 2011/12 season. He left Nottingham again in 2013 to return to his native New Zealand.

References

External links 
 Tigers profile
 Statbunker statistics

1982 births
English rugby union players
Leicester Tigers players
Living people
Rugby union hookers
Rugby union players from Gisborne, New Zealand